Dean Wolstenholme the elder (1757–1837) was an English animal painter.

Life
Born in Yorkshire, he spent most of his early life in Essex and Hertfordshire. He lived at Cheshunt, at Turnford, and then at Waltham Abbey. His early life was sporting, and he was an amateur artist. In 1793 he became involved in litigation over property at Waltham, and after three unsuccessful chancery suits was left in financial difficulty. He then took up painting as a profession.

Around the year 1800, Wolstenholme went to London and settled in East Street, Red Lion Square. In 1803, he exhibited his initial picture, Coursing, at the Royal Academy. Annually to 1824 his animal pictures then appeared at the Academy.  

After 1826 Wolstenholme painted little. He died in 1837 at the age of 80, and was buried in Old St. Pancras churchyard. The painter Dean Wolstenholme Jr. was his son.

Notes

Attribution

1757 births
1837 deaths
English painters
Animal painters
Artists from Yorkshire